The Right Honourable the Lord Lyon King of Arms, the head of Lyon Court, is the most junior of the Great Officers of State in Scotland and is the Scottish official with responsibility for regulating heraldry in that country, issuing new grants of arms, and serving as the judge of the Court of the Lord Lyon, the oldest heraldic court in the world that is still in daily operation.

The historic title of the post was the High Sennachie, and he was given the title of Lord Lyon from the lion in the coat of arms of Scotland.

The post was in the early nineteenth century held by an important nobleman, the Earl of Kinnoull, whose functions were in practice carried out by the Lyon-Depute. The practice of appointing Lyon-Deputes, however, ceased in 1866.

Responsibilities 
The Lord Lyon is responsible for overseeing state ceremonial in Scotland, for the granting of new arms to persons or organisations, and for confirming proven pedigrees and claims to existing arms as well as recognising clan chiefs after due diligence. He also registers and records new clan tartans, upon request from the clan chief. The Lyon Register (officially the Public Register of All Arms and Bearings in Scotland), on which the Lord Lyon records all Scotland's coats of arms, dates from 1672.

As Lyon Court is a government department, fees paid for granting coats of arms are paid to the Treasury. The misuse of arms is a criminal offence in Scotland, and treated as tax evasion. Prosecutions are brought before Lyon Court, Lord Lyon being the sole judge. Appeals from the Lyon Court can be made to the Court of Session in Edinburgh. There is no appeal if the Lord Lyon refuses to grant a coat of arms, as this is not a judicial function, but an exercise of his ministerial function, although an appeal by way of judicial review may succeed if it can be shown that the Lord Lyon acted unreasonably.

Equivalents 

The Lord Lyon has several English equivalents:
 Being responsible for Scottish state ceremonies he parallels the Earl Marshal in England.
 The Lord Lyon is the heraldic authority for Scotland, much as the English Kings of Arms are responsible for granting arms in England. England has three "Kings of Arms", or high heraldic officers (Lord Lyon is Scotland's only one): Garter Principal, Clarenceux (responsible for southern England), and Norroy and Ulster (responsible for northern England and Northern Ireland). Unlike the English Kings of Arms, who cannot grant arms without a warrant from the (English) Earl Marshal, Lyon does not need permission, but grants by his own power.
 Whilst in England the Court of Chivalry (which last met in 1954) is a civil court, in Scotland the Lyon Court meets often and has criminal jurisdiction. Lord Lyon is empowered to have assumed coats of arms, and whatever they are affixed to, destroyed. As an example, when Leith Town Hall, now used as a police station, was renovated during the 1990s, several of the coats of arms decorating the Council Chamber were found to be attributed to the wrong person. The police were given special permission to retain the display, on condition that the tourist guides pointed out the historical anomalies.

The Lord Lyon is also one of the few individuals in Scotland officially permitted to fly the "Lion Rampant", the Royal Banner of Scotland.

Symbols of office
A new collar of state was made in 1998 – a chain with 40 gold links, replacing the item that went missing after the Battle of Culloden. In 2003 a new crown was made for the Lord Lyon, modelled on the Scottish royal crown among the Honours of Scotland. This crown has removable arches (like one of the late Queen Mother's crowns) which will be removed at coronations to avoid any hint of lèse majesté.

Holders of the office

Lord Lyon Kings of Arms

Lyon Deputes

Coat of arms

See also

King of Arms
Garter Principal King of Arms
Clarenceux King of Arms
Norroy and Ulster King of Arms

References

Statutory acts 
 Lyon King of Arms Act 1592
 Lyon King of Arms Act 1669
 Lyon King of Arms Act 1672
 Lyon King of Arms Act 1867
 The Superannuation (Lyon King of Arms and Lyon Clerk) Order 1979

External links 

 
 Society of Scottish armigers
 The Heraldry Society of Scotland's pages on the Lord Lyon

Ceremonial officers in the United Kingdom
Court of the Lord Lyon
Government of Scotland
Judiciary of Scotland
Lists of office-holders in Scotland
Offices of arms
Political office-holders in Scotland
Positions within the British Royal Household
Scottish heraldry
Scottish society